Jelena Jovanović (born May 5, 1990) is a Serbian women's basketball player.

References

1990 births
Living people
Basketball players from Belgrade
Serbian expatriate basketball people in Bosnia and Herzegovina
Serbian expatriate basketball people in Bulgaria
Serbian expatriate basketball people in Spain
Serbian expatriate basketball people in Montenegro
Serbian expatriate basketball people in Romania
Serbian women's basketball players
Forwards (basketball)
Mediterranean Games silver medalists for Serbia
Competitors at the 2009 Mediterranean Games
Mediterranean Games medalists in basketball
ŽKK Radivoj Korać players
ŽKK Partizan players
ŽKK Crvena zvezda players